Kyle is a surname of Scottish origin.

It is derived from a placename, likely from Gaelic caol "narrow, strait"  but there are other possible derivations.

The name of the Kyle District itself is traditionally attributed to the legendary king Coel Hen (there are actually no narrows or straights in Ayrshire's Kyle District; c.f. Coylton).

On the geographical origin of those bearing the surname Kyle, by 1881 it occurred most densely in the county of Berwickshire, followed by Dumfries.

People with the surname include:
 Alexandra Kyle
 Andy Kyle, Canadian baseball player
Anne Dempster Kyle(1896-1966), American children's writer
 Beatrice Kyle
 Benjaman Kyle, American man with retrograde amnesia
 Chris Kyle (1974–2013), United States Navy SEAL
 Craig Kyle, American writer
 David Kyle, science fiction writer
 Doug Kyle, Canadian long-distance runner
 Duncan Kyle
George Kyle (1908–1998), Scottish footballer
Gunhild Kyle (1921–2016), Swedish historian
 Harry Macdonald Kyle, Scottish ichthyologist and pioneer of Fisheries science. 
 Iris Kyle, American 10-time overall Ms. Olympia professional bodybuilder
 Jack Kyle (1926–2014), Irish rugby player
 James H. Kyle
 Jason Kyle, former American football player
 Jayanthi Kyle, American singer
 Jeremy Kyle, British TV and radio presenter, best known for The Jeremy Kyle Show
 John C. Kyle
 John J. J. Kyle, Scots-born Argentine scientist
 John W. Kyle
 Jordan Kyle, American music producer, songwriter and sound engineer
 Kevin Kyle
 Louisa Venable Kyle (1903–1999), US writer
 Maeve Kyle
 Mark Kyle, Irish Olympic eventing rider
 Penelope W. Kyle
 Peter Kyle (footballer)
 Peter Kyle (politician), Labour MP for Hove since 2015
 Scott Kyle, Scottish actor
 Wallace Kyle

Fictional characters:
 Benjamin Kyle (Babylon 5)
 Selina Kyle

References

English-language surnames